Belle-Baie is a town in the Canadian province of New Brunswick. It was formed through the 2023 New Brunswick local governance reforms.

History 
Belle-Baie was incorporated on January 1, 2023 via the amalgamation of the former town of Beresford and the former villages of Nigadoo, Petit-Rocher and Pointe-Verte as well as the concurrent annexation of adjacent unincorporated areas. The adjacent unincorporated areas included the former local service districts of Dunlop, Laplante, Madran, Robertville, Petit-Rocher-Nord, Petit-Rocher-Sud and Tremblay, and portions of the local service districts of Bathurst, Beresford and North Tetagouche.

The new town's name was initially announced as Baie-Jolie sur mer, but after negative reaction from the residents the transition committee withdrew the name and proposed Belle-Baie instead.

The towns language policy for news releases to be reviewed after some residents complained they were in French only.  The review is expected to be completed in Spring 2023.  About 90% of the residents speak French, 70% speak english and the bilingual rate is around 68%.   When the Town was formed, it was desinated as French speaking by the transition committee.

Geography 
Belle-Baie is just north of the City of Bathurst and borders both Nepisiguit Bay and Chaleur Bay.

Government 
The community's first municipal election was held in November 2022 as part of the 2022 New Brunswick municipal elections, with former MLA Daniel Guitard selected as its first mayor.

See also 
List of communities in New Brunswick
List of municipalities in New Brunswick

References 

2023 establishments in New Brunswick
2023 New Brunswick local governance reform
Communities in Gloucester County, New Brunswick
Populated places established in 2023
Towns in New Brunswick